A scholar is a person who devotes themselves to scholarly pursuits. Scholar may also refer to:

 Academic
 Researcher
 Expert
 Intellectual
 Professor, especially one at university
 Student, especially one at university
 Someone holding an academic degree, especially a university diploma
 The recipient of a scholarship
 Anyone following the scholarly method 

Others
 Scholar-official, a bureaucrat official of Imperial China
 Torah scholar, one well versed in Jewish law
 Independent scholar

People
 Tom Scholar (born 1968) UK civil servant

Places
 Scholars Academy, South Carolina high school
 Scholars' Academy, New York high school

Publications
 The Scholar (journal), St. Mary's Law Review on Minority Issues
 The Scholars (poem) A poem by the Irish poet William Butler Yeats 
 The Scholars (Rúlín wàishǐ), a Chinese novel by Wu Jingzi completed in 1750

Music
 The Scholars (vocal group), a UK band
 The Scholars (band), a US band
 Scholars (album), a 2019 album by Buke and Gase
 A 1950s Texas pop music group, that is now famous as the first band Kenny Rogers recorded with.

Film and television
 The Scholar (film), (1918 film) an American film featuring Oliver Hardy
 The Scholar (TV series), a 2005 American reality television series

Other uses
 Google Scholar, Google scholarly papers search engine

See also

:Category:Scholars - The category of scholars, people who study a field
Schooler (disambiguation)
School (disambiguation)
Scholastic (disambiguation)
Scholarism (學民思潮) Hong Kong political movement
Scholarly method
Scholasticism